Karthy Govender is a commissioner for the South African Human Rights Commission. Karthy Govender, along with Commissioner Jody Kollapen are two Commissioners of minority South African Tamil ancestry. Karthy Govender is also an associate professor in the Law Faculty at the University of KwaZulu-Natal, where he teaches Constitutional and Administrative Law. He is also a visiting professor at the University of Michigan Law School. He has widely published in literature on Constitutional law.

References

External links
Karthy Govender  Website

Year of birth missing (living people)
Living people
South African people of Tamil descent
University of Durban-Westville alumni
University of Michigan Law School faculty